Tiruppattur block is a revenue block in the Sivaganga district of Tamil Nadu, India. It has a total of 40 panchayat villages.

References 

 

Revenue blocks of Sivaganga district